Dan Kalb is an American politician. He represents District 1 on the Oakland City Council, a position he has held since January 2013.

Education
In 1982, Kalb received an undergraduate degree from the University of California at Berkeley in Conservation of Natural Resources. In 1988 he received a master's degree in Public and Nonprofit Administration from the University of San Francisco.

Career

Kalb was California Policy Director at the Union of Concerned Scientists, which he joined in 2003. where he worked for nine years on renewable energy, climate, clean transportation and air quality legislation. Before joining UCS, he worked as director of a Sierra Club chapter and for California Common Cause, Media Alliance and CalPIRG.

After being elected to the Oakland City Council in Nov. 2012, he worked extensively on affordable housing, environmental, police oversight and good government legislation. in 2014 Kalb led a charter proposal to substantially strengthen the Oakland Public Ethics Commission (PEC). The Charter measure was voted on in the general election of November 2014. It passed with over 72% of the vote. He also was the lead author of a 2016 ballot measure to create a civilian police commission in Oakland. 

In 2018 he ran for California's 15th State Assembly district but lost to Jovanka Beckles by 0.6% for the second slot to run in the runoff against Buffy Wicks.

Recognition & Awards 
• Best Good Government Politician, 2014, East Bay Express

• Outstanding Elected Official of the Year, 2015, CA Public Library Advocates

• Most Effective Member of the (City) Council, 2016, Oakland Magazine

• Affordable Housing Champion, 2020, East Bay Housing Organizations (EBHO)

References

External links

 Oakland City Council member profile
 Articles about Kalb at East Bay Express, Oakland Local, Oakland North, and Oakland Post
 Kalb at Oakland Wiki
 

Living people
Oakland City Council members
University of California, Berkeley alumni
University of San Francisco alumni
Year of birth missing (living people)
21st-century American politicians